Harmohan Dhawan is an Indian politician and former Member of Parliament from Chandigarh, India. He was born on 14 July 1940 at Fatehjung, District Caimbalpur (now in West Pakistan). After the Partition of India in 1947, his family migrated to Ambala Cantonment where he did his Matriculation from B.D. High School, and Intermediate from S.D. College.

In 1960, Dhawan joined the Department of Botany at Panjab University, Chandigarh, and did his B.Sc. (Honours) in 1963 and MSc (Honours) in the year 1965. He was a research scholar from 1965 to 1970 and joined the PL 480 aided project, wherein he did research on "Cytological Studies of the Economic Plants of North West Himalayas". In 1970 he started a Small Scale Unit and became president of theIndustries Association of Chandigarh. In 1979, he opened Mehfil, a fine-dining restaurant.

Dhawan received the best Young Entrepreneur Award from the Vice President of India in  1983.

In 1977 he entered politics, and was mentored by the late prime minister Chandra Shekhar. He became president of the Janata Party in 1981. Because of his Socialist philosophies, he worked for the welfare of the downtrodden and went to jail more than 10 times for their cause.

In 1989 he was elected as Member of Parliament from the Chandigarh constituency and became Minister of Civil Aviation, in the late Mr. Chandra Shekhar's Government.

He was a senior leader of the Bharatiya Janata Party (BJP) which is now the single most dominant party of the Indian parliament after the 2014 general election. Dhawan has now joined the Aam Aadmi Party after being impressed by the performance of the Arvind Kejriwal-led Govt of Delhi. He is expected to be the AAP candidate from Chandigarh in the forthcoming Lok Sabha 2019 elections.

References

External links
 Official biographical sketch in Parliament of India website

1940 births
India MPs 1989–1991
Members of the Cabinet of India
Civil aviation ministers of India
Living people
Lok Sabha members from Chandigarh
Bharatiya Janata Party politicians from Chandigarh
Janata Dal politicians
Janata Party politicians
Samata Party politicians
Samajwadi Janata Party politicians